Series 19 of Top Gear, a British motoring magazine and factual television programme, was broadcast in the United Kingdom on BBC Two and BBC HD during 2013, consisting of five episodes between 29 January and 24 February, and a two-part feature-length special involving a road trip in Africa, titled "Africa Special", aired on 3–10 March. This series' highlights included the presenters race from London to Milan, a supercar road trip across California, and the creation of a home-made car for the elderly. The nineteenth series received criticism for one of its episodes' early filming featuring Jeremy Clarkson seeming to use a racial slur during a car review film.

Episodes

Criticism
Following accusations of racism made against Jeremy Clarkson for use of "Slope" comment in the Burma Special, an examination of his review of the Toyota GT86 and the Subaru BRZ in the nineteenth series revealed further criticism of racism. British newspaper The Daily Mirror revealed video evidence that in his reviews, in which he had used the rhyme eeny meeny miny moe for choosing the cars, one of the earlier takes of the scene featured him mumbling the word "nigger", which was historically a part of the rhyme's earlier versions; the actual transmitted scene used the word "teacher" instead of the racial epithet.

Clarkson initially denied the incident, but eventually issued an apology following the evidence's appearance. In his apology, he stated that he was "extremely keen" to avoid using the word, and that he had to do three takes with the film, adding that he was "mortified" that he appeared to actually mumble the word and that he did everything he could to avoid it being transmitted on the show.  He further proved this was the case with a note he sent to the production office, which read:

"I didn't use the N-word here but I've just listened through my headphones and it sounds like I did. Is there another take that we could use?",

This incident was one of two reasons that led to the BBC ultimately giving Clarkson a "final warning" in regards to the corporation's views on racist remarks.

Notes
The viewing figures shown in the Episode Table above, are a combination of the figures from the BBC Two broadcast and the BBC HD broadcast.

References

External links
Top Gear (series 19) at Top Gear Official Site

2013 British television seasons
Top Gear seasons